David Stephen Bridges (born 22 September 1982) is an English former professional footballer. He played as a midfielder.

Bridges started his career with local club Cambridge United, progressing through the club's youth system and eventually breaking into the first-team in 2001. He spent three seasons at Cambridge, before being released at the end of the 2003–04 season after failing to agree terms on a new contract. Bridges had a brief spell in Latvia playing for FK Rīga, before returning to England to play four games for Braintree Town in January 2005. He joined Histon in March 2005, playing for the club until the end of the season. He left Histon at the end of the season, and subsequently earned himself a one-year contract to rejoin Cambridge United in July 2005. He played regularly for the club for two seasons, but was released again in 2007.

Bridges then joined Kettering Town ahead of the 2007–08 season, helping the club achieve promotion from the Conference North to the Conference Premier in his first season at the club. At the end of the season he rejected a contract offer from Kettering and joined Stevenage on a free transfer. In his first season at the Hertfordshire club, he helped the team to FA Trophy success, as well as helping the club earn promotion to the Football League for the first time in the club's history the following season. He was also part of the squad that helped Stevenage earn back-to-back promotions during the 2010–11 season. Ahead of the 2011–12 season, Bridges re-joined Conference Premier club Kettering Town. He left the club after one season, and spent a year at Chelmsford City, before signing for Bury Town in May 2013. He had a brief spell at Brackley Town, before spending two seasons combining playing and coaching at King's Lynn Town.

He initially announced his retirement from playing in May 2016 and joined St Neots Town as first-team coach a year later, where he began playing again for the 2017–18 season. He left St Neots Town in August 2018, taking up the position of head of coaching at League Two club Lincoln City. Bridges also earned one cap for the England C team.

Early life
Born in Huntingdon, Cambridgeshire, Bridges attended St Peter's School in Huntingdon.

Club career

Cambridge United
Bridges played for local team Cambridge United, whom he joined at the age of eight, and he progressed through the club's youth system before signing his first professional contract in February 2002. He broke into the first-team towards the end of the 2001–02 season, making his debut as a substitute in a 1–0 defeat to Huddersfield Town at the Abbey Stadium on 16 March 2002. He played six further games in the same season, scoring his first goal for Cambridge in a 2–1 home victory against Tranmere Rovers on 13 April 2002. Bridges played regularly in the opening half of the 2002–03 season, playing 25 times and scoring once in a 3–0 victory against York City. A "persistent" ankle injury cut his run in the first-team short, and he did not play from February through to the remainder of the season. He returned to the first-team in a 1–0 defeat to Wycombe Wanderers on 14 October 2003, and played a further 22 times for the club throughout the 2003–04 season. Bridges left Cambridge at the end of the season after failing to agree a contract extension. On leaving Cambridge, Bridges said "I was offered a contract that was almost a kick in the teeth after the time I had been at the club when players were coming in from all over the place who did not care about the club. They were getting paid five or six times what I was offered, and I thought it was probably time to move on". During his three seasons with the club, Bridges made 55 appearances in all competitions, scoring four times.

Journeyman
Bridges trialled at a number of clubs before the start of the 2004–05 season, including Chesterfield and Northampton Town, without successfully securing a deal. He also spent the majority of the close season in the United States training with two professional American football clubs, before realising it was not financially viable to move to America on a permanent basis. Bridges struggled to find a club ahead of the 2004–05 season, and took up an offer to play for FK Rīga in Latvia. He suffered a fractured foot just ten days after signing for the club, and did not make any appearances for the Latvian club. Despite the injury, he spent three months in Latvia before returning to England to "assess his options". After returning to England in November 2004 for rehabilitation at Lilleshall, he began part-time training with Cambridgeshire club Histon in January 2005.

He signed for Braintree Town on a short-term contract shortly after training with Histon, making his debut for the club in a 2–1 home victory against Slough Town a day after joining the club. He suffered a foot injury in a 3–1 away victory at Hendon, which proved to be his last game for the club; he played four times for Braintree, all of which were victories. A month later, Bridges joined Histon on a short-term basis, making his debut for the club in March 2005, playing the whole match in a 3–1 home win against Tiverton Town. He scored once for Histon in a 3–0 home victory against Solihull Borough on 18 April 2005. Bridges made 11 appearances for Histon and helped the club achieve promotion to the Conference South in his two months at the club. He left Histon at the end of the season, and subsequently earned himself a one-year contract to re-join his former employers, Cambridge United, following a successful trial at the club. Bridges said he "did not hesitate in joining Cambridge for a second time" when he was eventually offered a full-time contract in June 2005.

Return to Cambridge
During the 2005–06 season, Bridges was a regular in the centre of Cambridge's midfield. He made his second debut for Cambridge in a 1–0 defeat at Forest Green Rovers, and scored in the following two games against both Hereford United and Accrington Stanley. Bridges played 40 times during the season, scoring seven goals from midfield. He was voted the club's Player of the Year award at the end of that season, as well as earning a one-year contract extension in May 2006.

He continued playing regularly under new manager Jimmy Quinn in the 2006–07 season. He scored his first goal of the season in a 3–0 home win against Gravesend & Northfleet in November 2006, and scored again two weeks later in the club's 2–1 away win at Southport at Haig Avenue. After Cambridge's 2–0 home defeat to St Albans City in December, Bridges did not feature in the first-team for two months. He returned to the first-team in Cambridge's 3–0 win against Woking on 27 January 2007, and scored his third of the season in a 2–1 away victory against Stafford Rangers. He played 31 games during the season, scoring three times. Bridges was released by Cambridge in May 2007 as they made wholesale changes to their playing squad. During his second spell at Cambridge, Bridges made 71 appearances in all competitions over two seasons, scoring ten times.

Kettering Town
Two months later, Bridges joined Conference North club Kettering Town on a one-year deal. Bridges made his debut for Kettering in late August 2007, starting in the club's 3–2 away victory against Worcester City. He scored his first goal for the club in the following game, doubling Kettering's lead in a victory against Tamworth. He played regularly for the Northamptonshire club throughout Kettering's 2007–08 league season, scoring 11 goals in 27 appearances to help Kettering earn promotion to the Conference Premier.

Stevenage
He was offered a new contract by manager Mark Cooper, which was rejected, as he opted to join his former Kettering team-mates Craig Westcarr and Gary Mills in signing for Stevenage on 13 May 2008. Bridges suffered a knee injury during pre-season and subsequently missed the first half of the 2008–09 season. He eventually made his debut for the Hertfordshire club in a 1–1 draw against Oxford United on 20 December 2008, scoring Stevenage's goal with an "unstoppable drive from outside the area". Bridges scored three goals in the club's successful FA Trophy run that season, scoring in 4–0 victories against both Burton Albion and Forest Green Rovers, as well as scoring the winner in Stevenage's 3–2 home win against Ebbsfleet United in the first leg of the semi-final. His season was cut short when he suffered an injury in a 1–1 draw against Oxford United at Broadhall Way, a game in which he scored Stevenage's goal, but ultimately missed the rest of the season. Bridges made 19 appearances during the club's 2008–09 season, scoring six times.

Bridges returned from injury at the start of the 2009–10 season, starting in a 0–0 draw against Barrow at Holker Street on 15 August 2009. He scored his first goal of the season in a 2–0 victory over Ebbsfleet United on 12 December 2009, and followed this up by scoring twice against Vauxhall Motors in the FA Trophy. He scored his eighth goal that season in a 1–0 victory over York City, the final league match of the club's 2009–10 season, as Stevenage earned promotion as Conference Premier champions. Bridges played 38 times during the season, scoring eight goals from midfield. He missed the first three games of the 2010–11 season as a result of the red card he received in the FA Trophy 2010 FA Trophy Final. He made his first appearance of the 2010–11 season in Stevenage's 1–1 draw away to Aldershot Town, coming on as a 38th-minute substitute. He suffered an ankle injury in training that ruled him out of first-team action for a month, returning to the first-team as a second-half substitute in Stevenage's 2–0 home defeat to Wycombe Wanderers, but admitted he was "not fully fit". He scored his only goal of the season in Stevenage's 3–1 away victory against Port Vale on 22 February 2011. Bridges played 24 games in all competitions, helping Stevenage earn promotion to League One in their first Football League season.

Return to Kettering
Bridges re-joined Conference Premier club Kettering Town on 1 August 2011, signing a two-year deal with the club. He joined Kettering on a free transfer, having been out of contract at Stevenage – "I got injured at the back end of last season and I was out of contract and because of all the deals that needed to be sorted at Stevenage, I wasn't a priority and I had to wait. There comes a time when you can't wait any longer and I needed to sort my future out so here we are". Bridges made his Kettering Town debut in a 2–0 away win at Lincoln City on 10 September 2011, the club's first away victory of the season. After making just five appearances for Kettering, Bridges was transfer-listed by new manager Mark Stimson on 29 September. Despite being transfer-listed due to Kettering's financial problems, Bridges continued to play in the first-team, and he scored his first goal for the club in a 2–2 draw against Ebbsfleet United, scoring from close range to give the club an initial one-goal lead. Bridges was forced to take training following the departure of Stimson, with only six other Kettering players turning up to train due to unpaid wages. Despite the off-field problems, he remained ever-present for the remainder of the season, playing 38 times in all competitions, and scoring his third and final goal of the season in a 1–1 home draw with Barrow on 21 April 2012. Kettering were relegated, finishing bottom of the league, and faced a further relegation due to entering a Company Voluntary Arrangement. Bridges had one-year remaining on his contract at Kettering, but left in July 2012, calling the season the "worst of his career".

Chelmsford City
In August 2012, Bridges signed for Conference South club Chelmsford City on a free transfer. He made his debut for the club in a 3–2 home win over Bromley on 25 August 2012. Bridges scored his first goal for Chelmsford in the club's 2–2 draw with East Thurrock United in the FA Cup on 20 October 2012, with a shot through a crowded penalty area after East Thurrock had failed to clear a corner. It took Bridges seven months to score his first league goal, netting on the hour mark in a 6–0 home victory over Farnborough on 18 March 2013, a game in which he also assisted two other goals. It proved to be his only league goal of the season, in which Chelmsford would once again make the Conference South play-offs, but ultimately fall short. They lost 2–1 on aggregate in the semi-finals to Salisbury City, with Bridges playing in both games. He made 36 appearances in all competitions during the season, scoring two goals.

Later career
Shortly after the end of the 2012–13 season, Bridges signed for Isthmian League Premier Division club Bury Town on a free transfer. On joining Bury Town, Bridges said – "I'm good friends with Adam Tann and Craig Parker and they couldn't say enough good things about the club. They told me that the players are really well looked after and the club is full of good honest people". He left Bury Town in December 2013 due to the club's financial problems, and subsequently joined Brackley Town of the National League North in January 2014. Bridges made his debut for Brackley on 11 January 2014, coming on as an 87th-minute substitute in a 3–1 victory over Gainsborough Trinity. He made 15 appearances during the second half of the 2013–14 season whilst at Brackley, scoring two goals.

Bridges left Brackley in the summer and signed for King's Lynn Town of the Northern Premier League on 28 May 2014. On securing the signing of Bridges for the season, manager Gary Setchell stated "I'm probably very, very fortunate I've stumbled across Bridgo when he's got a lot going on outside of football, business wise". Whilst out injured, and having already obtained his UEFA 'B' coaching badge, Bridges was made first-team coach at the club in February 2015. He combined the role alongside continuing to play in the first-team. King's Lynn were moved into the Southern League Premier Division for the 2015–16 season and Bridges played regularly in the King's Lynn team during the campaign, making 39 appearances in all competitions. Bridges retired from playing in May 2016 to "concentrate on his successful business ventures and spend time with his family". On his retirement, manager Setchell said "David will be missed by a lot of people at the football club but I totally understand his decision to call it a day on his fantastic playing career and pursue his business interests and spend more time with his young family."

Having been retired from playing for over a year, Bridges appeared for St Neots Town of the Southern League Premier Division, the club he was also first-team coach, in a 1–0 away loss against AFC Rushden & Diamonds in a Southern Combination Challenge Cup match on 3 October 2017. He ended up playing 25 times during the 2017–18 season, his final season playing, scoring five goals, including two in his final appearance as St Neots won the Huntingdonshire Senior Cup.

International career
Bridges was named in the England C team, who represent England at non-League level, in January 2006, for a friendly against Italy C, staged at Cambridge's Abbey Stadium, his home ground at the time. He came on as a 73rd-minute substitute as England C won the match 3–1 in front of a crowd of 2,711.

Style of play
Deployed predominantly as a central midfielder throughout his career, Bridges also played across all of the midfield areas. Manager Graham Westley said that Bridges is a player with "a lot of off-the-ball intelligence" and that he "reads the game well".

Coaching career
Bridges gained experience coaching whilst playing at Kettering Town, taking training sessions in January 2012 in the absence of a first-team manager. He gained his UEFA B Licence during his time playing at King's Lynn Town and became the club's first-team coach in February 2015, staying in the role for a year-and-a-half whilst also playing.

In May 2017, he took up his first coaching-only role when he joined St Neots Town of the Southern League Premier Division as first-team coach. Bridges left St Neots in order to become head of coaching at League Two club Lincoln City on 13 August 2018. He spent over two years at Lincoln, before being appointed as a coach educator for the Professional Footballers' Association in February 2021.

Personal life
He supports Manchester United.

Career statistics

A.  The "Other" column constitutes appearances and goals (including those as a substitute) in the Conference League Cup, FA Trophy and Football League Trophy.

International

Honours
Histon
 Southern Premier League: 2004–05

Kettering Town
 Conference North: 2007–08

Stevenage
 FA Trophy: 2008–09; runner-up: 2009–10
 Conference Premier: 2009–10
 League Two play-offs: 2010–11

St Neots Town
 Huntingdonshire Senior Cup: 2017–18

References

External links

1982 births
Living people
People from Huntingdon
English footballers
England semi-pro international footballers
Association football midfielders
Cambridge United F.C. players
FK Rīga players
Braintree Town F.C. players
Histon F.C. players
Kettering Town F.C. players
Stevenage F.C. players
Chelmsford City F.C. players
Bury Town F.C. players
Brackley Town F.C. players
King's Lynn Town F.C. players
St Neots Town F.C. players
English Football League players
National League (English football) players
Southern Football League players